Finland participated in the Eurovision Song Contest 2021 with the song "Dark Side" written by Aleksi Kaunisvesi, Joonas Porko, Joel Hokka, Niko Moilanen and Olli Matela. The song was performed by the band Blind Channel. The Finnish broadcaster  (Yle) organised the national final  in order to select the Finnish entry for the 2021 contest in Rotterdam, Netherlands. Seven entries were selected to compete in the national final on 20 February 2021 where the combination of votes from seven international jury groups and votes from the public selected "Dark Side" performed by Blind Channel as the winner.

Finland was drawn to compete in the second semi-final of the Eurovision Song Contest which took place on 20 May 2021. Performing during the show in position 14, "Dark Side" was announced among the top 10 entries of the second semi-final and therefore qualified to compete in the final on 22 May. It was later revealed that Finland placed fifth out of the 17 participating countries in the semi-final with 234 points. In the final, Finland performed in position 16 and placed sixth out of the 26 participating countries, scoring 301 points.

Background 

Prior to the 2021 Contest, Finland had participated in the Eurovision Song Contest fifty-three times since its first entry in 1961. Finland has won the contest once in 2006 with the song "Hard Rock Hallelujah" performed by Lordi. In the 2019 contest, "Look Away" performed by Darude featuring Sebastian Rejman failed to qualify Finland to the final, placing seventeenth (last) in the semi-final. In the 2020 contest, Aksel Kankaanranta was set to represent Finland with the song "Looking Back" before the contest's cancellation.

The Finnish national broadcaster,  (Yle), broadcasts the event within Finland and organises the selection process for the nation's entry. Yle confirmed their intentions to participate at the 2021 Eurovision Song Contest on 7 March 2020. Finland's entries for the Eurovision Song Contest have been selected through national final competitions that have varied in format over the years. Between 1961 and 2011, a selection show that was often titled  highlighted that the purpose of the program was to select a song for Eurovision. However, since 2012, the broadcaster has organised the selection show  (UMK), which focuses on showcasing new music with the winning song being selected as the Finnish Contest entry for that year. Along with their participation confirmation, the broadcaster also announced that the Finnish entry for the 2021 contest would be selected through .

Before Eurovision

Uuden Musiikin Kilpailu 2021
The competition consisted of a final on 20 February 2021, held at the Mediapolis in Tampere and hosted by Antti Tuisku. The competition was watched by 1.1 million viewers in Finland, making it the most watched edition of UMK since its establishment in 2012.

Competing entries 
A submission period was opened by Yle which lasted between 1 September 2020 and 7 September 2020. At least one of the writers and the lead singer(s) had to hold Finnish citizenship or live in Finland permanently in order for the entry to qualify to compete. A panel of eight experts appointed by Yle selected seven entries for the competition from the 278 received submissions. The experts were Tapio Hakanen (Head of Music at YleX), Anssi Autio (UMK producer), Juha-Matti Valtonen (television director), Samuli Väänänen (Senior Editor at Spotify Finland), Mirva Merimaa (CEO of Tiketti), Katri Norrlin (music journalist at YleX), Jani Kareinen (music journalist at YleX), Johan Lindroos (Head of Music at ) and Amie Borgar (Head of Music at ). The competing entries were presented during on 13 January 2021, while their lyric videos were released between 14 and 22 January 2021. Among the competing artists was Laura, who represented Estonia in the Eurovision Song Contest 2005 and 2017, and Aksel, who was to represent Finland in the Eurovision Song Contest 2020 before the contest was cancelled.

Final
The final took place on 20 February 2021 where seven entries competed. "Dark Side" performed by Blind Channel was selected as the winner by a combination of public votes (75%) and seven international jury groups from Iceland, Netherlands, Poland, Spain, Switzerland, the United Kingdom and the United States (25%). The viewers had a total of 882 points to award, while the juries had a total of 294 points to award. Each jury group distributed their points as follows: 2, 4, 6, 8, 10 and 12 points. The viewer vote was based on the percentage of votes each song achieved through the following voting methods: telephone, SMS and app voting. For example, if a song gained 10% of the viewer vote, then that entry would be awarded 10% of 882 points rounded to the nearest integer: 88 points. A total of 138,195 votes were cast during the show: 46,178 votes through telephone and SMS and 92,017 votes through the Yle app.

In addition to the performances of the competing entries, the show was opened by Antti Tuisku and Erika Vikman, while the interval act featured Haloo Helsinki! performing their single "Piilotan mun kyyneleet" and Antti Tuisku performing a medley of his songs.

At Eurovision 
According to Eurovision rules, all nations with the exceptions of the host country and the "Big Five" (France, Germany, Italy, Spain and the United Kingdom) are required to qualify from one of two semi-finals in order to compete for the final; the top ten countries from each semi-final progress to the final. The European Broadcasting Union (EBU) split up the competing countries into six different pots based on voting patterns from previous contests, with countries with favourable voting histories put into the same pot. The semi-final allocation draw held for the Eurovision Song Contest 2020 on 28 January 2020 was used for the 2021 contest, which Finland was placed into the second semi-final, to be held on 20 May 2021, and was scheduled to perform in the second half of the show.

Once all the competing songs for the 2021 contest had been released, the running order for the semi-finals was decided by the shows' producers rather than through another draw, so that similar songs were not placed next to each other. Finland was set to perform in position 14, following the entry from Bulgaria and before the entry from Latvia.

The two semi-finals and the final were televised in Finland on Yle TV1 with a second audio program providing commentary in Finnish by Mikko Silvennoinen, in Swedish by Eva Frantz and Johan Lindroos and in Russian by Levan Tvaltvadze. The Finnish spokesperson, who announced the top 12-point score awarded by the Finnish jury during the final, was Katri Norrlin.

Semi-final
Finland performed fourteenth in the second semi-final, following the entry from Bulgaria and preceding the entry from Latvia. At the end of the show, Finland was announced as having finished in the top 10 and subsequently qualifying for the grand final. It was later revealed that Finland placed fifth in the semi-final, receiving a total of 234 points: 150 points from the televoting and 84 from the juries.

Final
Shortly after the second semi-final, a winners' press conference was held for the ten qualifying countries. As part of this press conference, the qualifying artists took part in a draw to determine which half of the grand final they would subsequently participate in. Finland was drawn to compete in the second half. Following this draw, the shows' producers decided upon the running order of the final, as they had done for the semi-finals. Finland was subsequently placed to perform in position 16, following the entry from Germany and before the entry from Bulgaria. Finland placed sixth in the final, scoring 301 points: 218 points from the televoting and 83 from the juries.

Voting 
Voting during the three shows involved each country awarding two sets of points from 1-8, 10 and 12: one from their professional jury and the other from televoting. Each nation's jury consisted of five music industry professionals who are citizens of the country they represent. This jury judged each entry based on: vocal capacity; the stage performance; the song's composition and originality; and the overall impression by the act. In addition, each member of a national jury may only take part in the panel once every three years, and no jury was permitted to discuss of their vote with other members or be related in any way to any of the competing acts in such a way that they cannot vote impartially and independently. The individual rankings of each jury member in an anonymised form as well as the nation's televoting results were released shortly after the grand final.

Below is a breakdown of points awarded to Finland and awarded by Finland in the second semi-final and grand final of the contest, and the breakdown of the jury voting and televoting conducted during the two shows:

Points awarded to Finland

Points awarded by Finland

Detailed voting results 
The following members comprised the Finnish jury:
 Amie Borgar
 Jussi Mäntysaari
 Mirva Merimaa
 Tommi Tuomainen
 Samuli Väänänen

References

External links 
Official Yle Eurovision site
Official Uuden Musiikin Kilpailu 2021 site

2021
Countries in the Eurovision Song Contest 2021
Eurovision
Eurovision